Levi Savage Peterson (born 1933) is a Mormon biographer, essayist and fictionist whose best-known works include a seminal biography of Juanita Brooks, his own autobiography, and his novel The Backslider, "standard for the contemporary Mormon novel." He was born and reared in the Mormon community of Snowflake, Arizona and is an emeritus professor of English at Weber State University in Ogden, Utah. He served a mission for The Church of Jesus Christ of Latter-day Saints in France and Belgium from 1954 to 1957. He edited Dialogue: A Journal of Mormon Thought from 2004 to 2008.

Peterson's work as a writer centers in "the possibility of wrong behavior"; his works "variously examine the tension between Sainthood as fact and Sainthood as aspiration, between belief and doubt, and between expected blessings and the traumas of reality." Similarly, he taught his writing students to "Write from the other side of your inhibitions." In an essay entitled "In Defense of a Mormon Erotica," Peterson stated that "prudery reinforces pornography" by hiding sexual feelings. He encouraged Mormon authors to include sexual content and obscenities in an appropriate portion in their work, writing, "there is a vitality in sexual imagery and obscenities."

Peterson has been the recipient of several AML Awards: Short Fiction (1978) for "The Confessions of Augustine", Short Fiction (1982–1983) for "The Canyons of Grace", Special Award for Short Story Anthology (1982–1983) for Greening Wheat: Fifteen Mormon Short Stories, Novel (1986) for The Backslider, Special Recognition in Biography (1988) for Juanita Brooks: Mormon Woman Historian, Honorary Lifetime Membership (1988), Smith-Pettit Foundation Award for Outstanding Contribution to Mormon Letters (2009), and Short Fiction (2016) for "Kid Kirby". Additionally, his work has been a finalist in the short fiction category twice: 2014 ("Jesus Enough") and 2019 ("Bode and Iris").

Partial bibliography

References

External links
 
 Mormon Expression interview with Levi Peterson
 Mormon Stories interview with Levi Peterson

1933 births
20th-century American novelists
American Latter Day Saint writers
American male novelists
Living people
Mormon studies scholars
Weber State University faculty
Novelists from Utah
Novelists from Arizona
People from Snowflake, Arizona
Mormon memoirists
Latter Day Saints from Arizona
Latter Day Saints from Utah
American male non-fiction writers
20th-century American male writers